"Pass the Dutchie" is a 1982 song performed by British-Jamaican band Musical Youth, taken from their debut studio album, The Youth of Today. It was produced by Toney Owens from Kingston, Jamaica. The song was a major hit, reaching number one on the UK Singles Chart, and at least five other countries. It peaked at 10 in the United States and sold over 5 million copies worldwide.

Background
The song was the band's first release on a major label. Following a shouted intro taken from U Roy's "Rule the Nation" with words slightly altered, the track combined two songs: "Gimme the Music" by U Brown, and "Pass the Kouchie" by Mighty Diamonds, which deals with the recreational use of cannabis (kouchie being slang for a cannabis pipe). For the cover version, the song's title was bowdlerised to "Pass the Dutchie", the new word being a patois term for a Dutch oven, a type of cooking pot. All obvious drug references were removed from the lyrics; e.g., instead of the original "How does it feel when you got no herb?", the cover version refers to "food" instead. "Dutchie" may subtly refer to the brand Dutch Masters which manufactures cigars and cigarillos that are used smoke cannabis. 

The song was first championed by radio DJ Zach Diezel and became an instant hit when it was picked up by MCA Records in September 1982. It debuted at #26 on the UK chart and rose to #1 the following week. In February 1983, it reached #10 on the Billboard Hot 100 singles chart in the USA. Though they would have subsequent Top 40 hits in other countries, "Pass the Dutchie" remains their only hit in the US. The song also scored the #1 position in at least five other countries, eventually selling more than five million copies worldwide. After the song was featured in the Netflix series Stranger Things in 2022, it experienced a resurgence of popularity, re-entering a number of international charts.

Music video
The video, directed by Don Letts, was shot partly on the southern banks of the River Thames in London, by Lambeth Bridge. It depicts the band performing the song and playing instruments. At the same time, a school official appears to arrest them, wherein he ends up falling down and breaking his arm. This footage is interspersed with courtroom scenes (featuring Julian Firth), where the band is put on trial. The trial ends with the jury finding the band not guilty, leading them to celebrate in the courtroom.

Track listing

7" single
A. "Pass the Dutchie" – 3:25
B. "Please Give Love a Chance" – 3:36

12" single
A. "Pass the Dutchie" – 6:05
B. "Pass the Dutchie" (Special Dub Mix) – 4:40

CD maxi single (1994)
 "Pass the Dutchie" (Molella Mega Club Mix) – 4:20
 "Pass the Dutchie" (Molella Hard Ragga Mix) – 5:00
 "Pass the Dutchie" (Molella Radio Mix) – 3:40
 "Pass the Dutchie" (Original 7" Version) – 3:23

Digital single (2008)
 "Pass the Dutchie" (Exclusive Version) – 3:40
 "Pass the Dutchie" (Singalong Version) – 3:40

Digital maxi single (2011)
 "Pass the Dutchie" (Re-Recorded / Remastered) – 3:40
 "Pass the Dutchie" (Dubstep Kings Remix) – 4:05
 "Pass the Dutchie" (Singalong Version) – 3:40
 "Pass the Dutchie" (Dubstep Kings Instrumental Remix) – 4:05

Digital single (2016)
 "Pass the Dutchie" (Odjbox Remix) – 3:42

Digital single (2019)
 "Pass the Dutchie" (Star Slinger Remix) – 3:42

Digital single (2020)
 "Pass the Dutchie 21" – 4:33

Charts and certifications

Weekly charts

Year end charts

Certifications

Cover versions
 The song was parodied by a band from the Seychelles Islands Dezil' under the title "Laisse tomber les filles (qui se maquillent)", and peaked at #13 in France and #47 in Switzerland in 2006.

References

1982 debut singles
1982 songs
Dutch Top 40 number-one singles
Irish Singles Chart number-one singles
Musical Youth songs
Number-one singles in Australia
Number-one singles in Israel
Number-one singles in New Zealand
Number-one singles in Spain
Number-one singles in Switzerland
RPM Top Singles number-one singles
Reggae fusion songs
Song recordings produced by Peter Collins (record producer)
UK Singles Chart number-one singles
Ultratop 50 Singles (Flanders) number-one singles
Songs involved in royalties controversies
2022 singles
Music videos directed by Don Letts